is a masculine Japanese given name.

Orthography
Takeru can be written using different kanji characters and can mean:
 武, "warrior"
 猛, "fierce"
 健, "health"
 尊, "noble"
 岳, "mountain"
The name can also be written in hiragana or katakana.

Kanji combinations of the name are:
 武尊
 武瑠
 武流
 武琉
 武留
 丈瑠
 丈流
 丈琉
 丈留
 尊瑠
 尊流
 尊琉
 尊留

People 
Takeru Imamura (猛), a Japanese baseball player
Takeru Inukai (健), a Japanese politician
Takeru "Tsunami" Kobayashi (尊), a Japanese competitive eater
Takeru (Sug) (武瑠), a Japanese singer from the rock band Sug
Takeru Nagayoshi (たける), a Japanese manga artist
Takeru Satoh (健), a Japanese actor, portrays Ryotaro Nogami in tokusatsu series Kamen Rider Den-O
, Japanese kickboxer
Yamato Takeru (タケル), legendary Japanese prince

Fictional characters
Takeru (aka RedMask), a character in Hikari Sentai Maskman
Takeru (タケル), the main character in the Freedom Project by Nissin Cup Noodles
Takeru (猛), secondary character from the visual novel, anime and manga Togainu no Chi
Takeru Edogawa, a character in the manga series The Devil Does Exist
Takeru Fujiwara, a character from Prince of Stride
Takeru Ibaraki, a character in the American comic book series Witchblade
Takeru Mizushima (タケル), a character in the Japanese TV drama Last Friends
Takeru Ohyama, the main character in the anime and manga series Maken-ki!
Takeru Shiba, a character in Samurai Sentai Shinkenger
Takeru Shirogane, the main character in the visual novel series Muv-Luv
Takeru "T.K." Takaishi (タケル), a character in the anime and manga Digimon
Takeru Takemoto (タケル), a character in the anime This Ugly Yet Beautiful World
Takeru Teshimine (猛), a character in the anime and manga series GetBackers
Takeru Yamato, the main character in the Dragon Knight series of Anime/H-games
Takeru Tenkuji, the main character in Kamen Rider Ghost
Takeru Tsukumo, a main character in the manga Exoskull Zero 
Takeru Jakuzure, a character from Garo
Takeru Homura, a main character in Yu-Gi-Oh! VRAINS

Other uses
Takeru: Letter of the Law, an interactive manga
Takeru, video game developer and publisher
Brother Industries Takeru, software distribution mechanism in Japan

Japanese masculine given names